Adaiyur is a panchayat village in the Indian state of Tamil Nadu. Administratively, Adaiyur is under Idappadi taluk of Salem district in Tamil Nadu. It is 45 km by road west of Salem.

There is one village in the Adaiyur gram panchayat: Adaiyur. As of 2011 it had a population of 3,567.

Notes

Villages in Salem district